is an underground metro station located in Tempaku-ku, Nagoya, Aichi Prefecture, Japan operated by the Nagoya Municipal Subway’s Sakura-dōri Line. It is located 16.0 kilometers from the terminus of the Sakura-dōri Line at Nakamura Kuyakusho Station.

History
Naruko Kita Station was opened on 27 March 2011.

Lines

 (Station number: S18)

Layout
Naruko Kita Station has a single underground island platform with platform screen doors.

Platforms

External links
 Naruko Kita Station official web site

References

Railway stations in Japan opened in 2011
Railway stations in Aichi Prefecture